The 6th convocation of the Milli Majlis of Azerbaijan were formed on the basis of the elections held on 9 February 2020.

70 out of 125 deputies of the Milli Majlis were members of the New Azerbaijan Party (NAP). VI convocation VHP was represented in the Milli Majlis by 3 people, AVP, ADISP, ADMP, BGP, BAXCP, VAHDAT and VBP by 1 person. 41 members were independent.

On March 10, 2020, the first session of the Milli Majlis of the VI convocation took place. The term of office of the deputies of the 6th convocation of the Milli Majlis will end on March 10, 2025.

The 6th convocation was chaired by YAP member Sahiba Gafarova, the first deputy chairman was neutral Adil Aliyev, and the deputy chairmen were VHP member Fazail Ibrahimli and YAP member Ali Huseynli. Sahiba Gafarova became the first female speaker of the National Assembly of Azerbaijan.

Fattah Heydarov, born in 1938, was the oldest among the deputies of the 6th convocation of the Milli Majlis, and Sabina Khasayeva, born in 1993, was the youngest.

List of members 
This list includes the current deputies of the National Assembly.

Notes

References 

National Assembly (Azerbaijan)
National Assembly of Azerbaijan
2020s in Azerbaijan